Troy Selvey (born July 1, 1980, in Denver, Colorado) is an American former basketball player who played until December 2007 for Bc Mures, in the Romanian Basketball Division A. He plays center or power forward positions and his height is 2,03 m (weight: 116 kg). His previous teams were: Sacramento State Hornets, Los Piasas de Cabo San Lucas (CIBACOPA in Mexico), Coventry Crusaders (England), Essex Leopards (England) and Tabera (Uruguay).

BC Mures
He played for BC Mures almost two consecutive seasons. In the 2006/2007 regular season he played in 25 games, averaging 33.7 minutes, 14.2 points and 9.1 rebounds. His team finished on the 9th place in the Romanian first division, being just one win away from the playoffs.

References 
 
  (Fans about Troy – eng)
   (Fans about Troy – rom, but with Selvey's farewell message)

1980 births
Living people
American expatriate basketball people in Mexico
American expatriate basketball people in Romania
American expatriate basketball people in the United Kingdom
American expatriate basketball people in Uruguay
American men's basketball players
Basketball players from Denver
Sacramento State Hornets men's basketball players
BC Mureș players
Centers (basketball)
Power forwards (basketball)